Krasnoye Razdolye is a rural locality (a settlement) in Shipunikhinsky Selsoviet, Tretyakovsky District, Altai Krai, Russia. The population was 13 as of 2013. There is 1 street.

Geography 
Krasnoye Razdolye is located 39 km southeast of Staroaleyskoye (the district's administrative centre) by road. Pervokamenka is the nearest rural locality.

References 

Rural localities in Tretyakovsky District